Gao Kelin (March 11, 1907 – June 18, 2001) original name Gao Wenmin, was a People's Republic of China politician. He was born in Chishui Town, Hua County, Shaanxi Province (now part of Huazhou District, Weinan, Shaanxi Province). He was Communist Party of China Committee Secretary of Shanxi Province.

1907 births
2001 deaths
People's Republic of China politicians from Shaanxi
Chinese Communist Party politicians from Shaanxi
Political office-holders in Shanxi
Delegates to the 2nd National People's Congress
Delegates to the 3rd National People's Congress